Since about 1970, California has been experiencing an extended and increasing housing shortage, such that by 2018, California ranked 49th among the states of the U.S. in terms of housing units per resident.   This shortage has been estimated to be 3-4 million housing units (20-30% of California's housing stock, 14 million) . Experts say that California needs to double its current rate of housing production (85,000 units per year) to keep up with expected population growth and prevent prices from further increasing, and needs to quadruple the current rate of housing production over the next seven years in order for prices and rents to decline.

The imbalance between supply and demand resulted from strong economic growth creating hundreds of thousands of new jobs (which increases demand for housing) and insufficient construction of enough new housing units to meet demand.  From 2012 to 2017 statewide, for every five new residents, one new housing unit was constructed. In California's coastal urban areas, (where the majority of job growth has occurred since the Great Recession), the disparity is greater: in the Bay Area, seven times as many jobs were created as housing units.  By 2017, this resulted in the median price of a California home being over 2.5 times the median U.S. price.  As a result, less than a third of Californians can afford a median priced home (nationally, slightly more than half can), 6 percent more residents are in poverty than would be with average housing costs (20% vs. 14%), homelessness per capita is the third highest in the nation, the state's economy is suppressed by $150–400 billion annually (5-14%) (because of lost construction activity, and money that must be spent on housing cannot be spent on other consumer goods), and the long commutes caused by unaffordable housing in the urban centers where jobs are is hindering California's ability to meet its CO2 emissions goals.

Several factors have together caused constraints on the construction of new housing: density restrictions (e.g. single-family zoning) and high land cost conspire to keep land and housing prices high; community involvement in the permitting process allows current residents who oppose new construction (often referred to as NIMBYs) to lobby their city council to deny new development; environmental laws are often abused by local residents and others to block or gain concessions from new development (making it more costly or too expensive to be profitable); greater local tax revenues from hotels, commercial, and retail development vs. residential incentivize cities to permit less residential; and construction costs are greater because of high impact fees, and often developments are only approved if union labor is used.

In 2016, the Obama Administration recommended that cities across the nation with high housing costs reform their land use regulations to enable opportunity for people at all income levels to access jobs being created in growing cities. Since then, the California legislature has passed several bills: some reduced the fees and bureaucracy involved in creating ADUs, while others have added fees to real-estate document recording to finance low-income housing; yet even the most optimistic projections find that relative to the scope of the problem, these will have minimal effect.  In addition, proposed bills that would have legalized higher density development close to public transit failed in the legislature.  In 2019, the Council of Economic Advisers estimated that deregulating the housing market would lead to rents falling by 55 percent in San Francisco, 40 percent in Los Angeles, and 40 percent in San Diego.

Background

Issi Romem, an economist at the Terner Center for Housing Innovation at the University of California, Berkeley said: 
"...as long as abundant new housing was built to accommodate those drawn to California, housing price growth was limited and the state's allure was channeled into population growth: From 1940 to 1970 California's population grew 242 percent faster than the national pace, while the growth of its median home value was only 16 percent faster than the nation's."

Starting in 1970, three major forces caused housing prices to increase dramatically: land use restrictions limiting housing density (zoning many areas to single-family homes, or to at most two stories), increased concern for the environment (which led to environmental laws and  designating land for preservation and not development), and community involvement in the development process (which allows current—but not future—residents a say in land use decisions.)

The result of these policies was that from 1970 to 2016, California's population growth (relative to the US average) slowed to a third of what it was during the previous three decades (70 percent faster than the national pace by 2016), while appreciation of median home prices (relative to the US average) more than quadrupled to 80 percent greater than the national rate. 

By 2016, the median price of a home in California, at $409,300, was more than twice the median price of a home in the U.S. as a whole, more expensive than any state other than Hawaii. The shortage is statewide; from 2010 to 2017, the state added one new housing unit for every five new residents, and is pronounced in employment centers such as the Bay Area and Los Angeles.

The housing situation affects individuals differently, depending upon their circumstances.  A person who has long since paid off a home mortgage has much lower costs than a renter or someone buying a first home.  , about 20 percent of California homeowners owned their homes free and clear, and 80 percent were still paying a mortgage.  As is typical, homeowners without a mortgage tend to have lower incomes (e.g., due to retirement) than homeowners with a mortgage.  California homeowners without a mortgage tend to spend almost 9% of their income on housing costs, including property taxes, which is slightly lower than the national average for homeowners without a mortgage.

Causes

The imbalance between supply and demand; resulted from of strong economic growth creating hundreds of thousands of new jobs (which increases demand for housing) and the insufficient construction of new housing units to provide enough supply to meet the demand.  Fewer housing units built in the urban and coastal areas relative to the demand created by economic growth in those areas resulted in higher prices for housing and spillover to the inland areas. For example, from 2012 to 2017, San Francisco Bay area cities added 400,000 new jobs, but only issued 60,000 permits for new housing units. (For California as a whole, from 2011 to 2016, the state added only one new housing unit for every five new residents.) This has driven home prices and rents to high levels, such that by 2017, the median price of a home across California was more than 2.5 times the median in the U.S. as a whole, and in California's coastal urban areas, (where the majority of job growth has occurred since the Great Recession), the shortages are greater.

Several factors have together caused constraints on the construction of new housing.

Community resistance (NIMBYism)
NIMBY ("Not In My Back Yard") resistance by existing residents to new development is a major contributor to the difficulty of developing new housing in the state. People who already live in an area often perceive any new development or change as driving increased negative traffic and population impacts. Using various means (political pressure, protests, and voting power), NIMBYs try to keep newcomers out by defeating development projects in the local government permitting process, or slowing them down to the point that they become uneconomical for the builders.

"Localism" (a seemingly egalitarian belief that incumbent residents have the moral authority to define what their community will look like) has been found to instead result in imbalances which favor white, affluent homeowners, and suggest that localism is more prevalent in planning practice than in the general population. On this issue, New York Times opinion writer Farhad Manjoo stated: "What Republicans want to do with I.C.E. and border walls, wealthy progressive Democrats are doing with zoning and Nimbyism. Preserving “local character,” maintaining “local control,” keeping housing scarce and inaccessible — the goals of both sides are really the same: to keep people out."

In 2022, California governor Gavin Newsom declared that "NIMBYism is destroying the state" and promised to hold cities and counties accountable for stopping new housing development.

Environmental laws
Environmental laws—primarily the California Environmental Quality Act (CEQA)—can be a hurdle to housing development. 
CEQA requires the permitting agency, usually a local government, to review each new project in accordance with CEQA to provide a full disclosure of the project's impacts to the approval body (usually a planning commission or city council) and the public. Individual single-family homes are exempt, as well as some smaller multi-family projects, but most mid-size and larger projects must go through a Negative Declaration or EIR to provide the required level of disclosure of project impacts. The EIR process requires the developer to conduct studies and provide a report on a wide variety of impacts including traffic congestion, wildfire evacuation, fire safety, noise, air pollution, greenhouse gas emissions, water pollution, biological resources, cultural resources and infrastructure impacts and develop a plan to help mitigate any impacts if any exist. The CEQA process is intended to make the approval process transparent to the public and decision-makers and takes place prior to a local government acting to permit a new development. Additionally, CEQA allows for legal challenges against the CEQA review process itself which may result in lawsuits by those who oppose the project and find the developer did not properly study the impacts from a project prior to the local government approving the project. Litigation is the main enforcement mechanism by which CEQA violations are mitigated.
A report by the California Legislative Analyst's Office found that in the state's 10 largest cities, CEQA appeals delayed projects by an average of two and a half years.

A 2015 study by Jennifer Hernandez and others at the environmental and land-use law firm Holland & Knight, looking at all CEQA lawsuits filed during the three-year period 2010–2012, found that less than 15% were filed by groups with prior records of environmental advocacy. This study also found that four of five CEQA lawsuits targeted infill development projects; only 20 percent of CEQA lawsuits were targeted at "greenfield" projects that would develop open space.

Carol Galante, a professor of Affordable Housing and Urban Policy at the Terner Center for Housing Innovation at UC Berkeley, who served in the Obama Administration as the Assistant Secretary at the U.S. Department of Housing and Urban Development (HUD), stated that "It (CEQA) has been abused in this state for 30 years by people who use it when it has nothing to do with an environmental reason, ... NIMBY-ism is connected to the fact that for everyone who owns their little piece of the dream, there&apos;s no reason to want development next door to them, CEQA gives them a tool to effectuate their interest ... We need to fundamentally rethink how the CEQA process works in this state."

In an interview with UCLA's Blueprint magazine, Governor Jerry Brown commented on the use of CEQA for other than environmental reasons: "But it's easier to build in Texas. It is. And maybe we could change that. But you know what? The trouble is the political climate, that's just kind of where we are. Very hard to — you can't change CEQA [the California Environmental Quality Act]. BP: Why not? JB: The unions won't let you because they use it as a hammer to get project labor agreements."

A CEQA study (commissioned by the Rose Foundation, an environmental advocacy group) done by BAE Urban Economics, estimated that 0.7% of all CEQA projects with review documents had been subject to litigation, for the years 2013–2015. In San Francisco, the attorney general's office, during an 18-month audit of CEQA in 2012, found that 0.3% of (non-exempt) CEQA projects were subject to lawsuits.

Tax structures
Partially because Proposition 13 limits the property tax that local and state governments can collect, cities are incentivized to permit commercial development rather than residential development. Commercial development can potentially yield both sales tax revenue (car dealerships and shopping malls are examples of favored development due to their density of revenue), as well as business tax revenue (many cities levy either a payroll tax or a gross-receipts tax on all businesses located within their boundaries).

Residential development is typically seen as a net loss to a city's budget due to costs associated with service delivery (public safety, roads, parks, etc.) to residents exceeding the tax revenue received from those residents. For example, the city of Brisbane, when considering developing a greenfield (Brisbane Baylands development), was told that a housing-heavy development would bring in $1 million annually in additional income for the town, but a commercial development with no housing and a larger hotel would bring in $9 million annually—and that without building hotels, the development would be a net loss to the city budget.

High land cost and low density
High land cost and low-density development with very small increases in housing density, which in turn keep land prices high.  The Sacramento Bee notes that residential land prices are more than 600% greater in coastal California than the average of America's other large metropolitan areas.

Coastal Commission
The commission was formed over opposition to the Sea Ranch development preventing access to the beach. Specific housing developments opposed by the Commission include 895 homes in Orange County, 50 homes for the disabled in Half Moon Bay, and 400 apartment units in Ventura County. The Commission sets fees and fines for permit violations and has levied million-dollar penalties. It has been called the single most powerful land use authority in the United States given the high values of its jurisdiction and its vast environmental assets, and that, because its members are appointed by the governor and the State Senate and Assembly leaders which have generally been Democrats, the Commission reflects a constituency that is important to Democrats. Some research has examined its effects in particular:
UCLA researchers documented that quality-adjusted homes inside the commission's jurisdiction were 20% more expensive than those just outside it because of restrictions on housing supply and enhancements to natural amenities that increase demand. 
A UCSB research paper found that the Commission increased housing prices by restricting supply thereby “harming renters, future home buyers, and owners of undeveloped land,” but existing homeowners in the commission's jurisdiction were beneficiaries of home price increases.

Construction costs
The state levies higher development fees for building a single-family home than in the rest of the country on average. The California Legislative Analyst's Office reported it to be 266% greater, $22k vs. $6k.  For example, the developer planning to redevelop the site of a former Naval Hospital in Oakland with a residential community of 935 homes will be paying $20M (= $21k / home) in fees to the City of Oakland's affordable housing fund.

Labor costs are higher because of prevailing wage laws and that some projects are only approved if union labor is used. This was estimated at 20% more by the California LAO. The contribution of prevailing wage requirements to total construction cost has been estimated to be as large as a 40 percent increase.

Material costs are higher due to building codes and standards requiring better quality materials and higher energy efficiency.

Effects

Affordability

This shortage has driven home prices and rents to extremely high levels.  In 2017, the median price of a home in California was more than 2.5 times the median in the U.S. as a whole, and in California's coastal urban areas, the shortage was greater than the inland areas, as demonstrated by the median prices of homes in those respective markets: $1.3M in San Francisco, $1M in San Jose, and $600k in Los Angeles, while only $250k in Fresno.  In the rental market, California now has the lowest vacancy rate the state has ever seen, at 3.6%; and while the median rent throughout the state for a two-bedroom apartment is $2,400, the median rent in coastal urban areas is even higher, surpassing $4,000 per month in San Francisco.

(Nationally, more than half of American households can afford the median-priced American home.) Housing unaffordability also leads to crowding, defined as more than one adult per room of a dwelling (counting two children as one adult). Californians are four times as likely to live in crowded housing as the average American, and this holds across every type of housing—renters, owners, those with and without children.

When comparing the rental rates of Los Angeles and the average rate across the United States one can see just how much higher the city is compared to the rest of the country.  While in 2017 the average rental rate in the United States was $1,357, in comparison the average rental rate in Los Angeles in 2017 was $2,284, almost a $1,000 average increase.

Displacement and environmental impact

As a result, workers have moved to more affordable inland locations which requires longer commutes. , the three cities in the United States with the largest share of super commuters—workers spending an hour and a half or more each way to get to and from their jobs—are Stockton, Modesto and Riverside. Workers have been displaced outside of the state as well; from 2007 to 2016, California saw net out-migration among all groups making under $110,000 a year, largely to Sun Belt states like Arizona, Nevada and Texas.

Longer commutes and increased traffic caused by suburban sprawl due to housing shortages concentrated in job centers increase greenhouse gas emissions. Because of California's mild climate and heavily renewable energy mix, transportation is the largest category of emissions in the state. When Californians emigrate to states with higher per-capita greenhouse gas emissions, they drive more, consume more energy for air conditioning, and use more fossil fuel-dependent electricity generation. Scarce, low-density housing is directly at odds with California's climate goals. “You can't be pro-environment and anti-housing, ... You can't be anti-sprawl and anti-housing. This is something that has not been very well understood.” - Marlon Boarnet, chair of the Department of Urban Planning and Spatial Analysis at USC.

Scientists at the Renewable and Appropriate Energy Laboratory at the University of California, Berkeley recently found that infill development, that is utilizing existing vacant urban structures for future housing or commercial use, has the potential to reduce CO2 emissions; more so than any other option. Simply put, creating a denser housing structure limits the amount of travel time from work to home and back, thus limiting CO2 emissions drastically. At governor Gavin Newsom's first legislative session, he pledged to make the housing crisis one of his top priorities. One such solution is the More Homes Act, which overrides restrictive zoning requirements by implementing small to midsize apartment buildings near major job and transit centers.

Poverty

When the cost of housing is factored into the poverty rate, as the Census Bureau now does in its releases of the "Supplemental Poverty Measure," California's poverty rate lists as the highest in the nation, (and has since 2011, when the Census Bureau first started releasing poverty by this measure) currently at 20.4%, or just over 1 in 5 people.   The Public Policy Institute of California estimates that if the housing costs in California matched those for the nation overall, California's poverty rate would instead be 14 percent.

Homelessness

California in 2017 is home to an oversized share of the nation's homeless: 22%, for a state whose residents only make up 12% of the country's total population.   The Sacramento Bee notes that large cities like Los Angeles and San Francisco both attribute their increases in homeless to the housing shortage.  Homeless persons in California now number 135,000 (a 15% increase from 2015).

A study by the California Housing Partnership found that from 2016 to 2017 homelessness increased by 47 percent in Sacramento County (home to the state's capital, Sacramento), 36 percent in Alameda County, and 13 percent in Santa Clara County.

Nationwide, California ranks third for the most homeless persons per capita, behind New York and Hawaii.

In September 2019, the Trump Administration's Council of Economic Advisers released a report in which they stated that deregulation of the housing markets would reduce homelessness in some of the most constrained markets by estimates of 54 percent in San Francisco, 40 percent in Los Angeles,  and 38 percent in San Diego, because rents would fall by 55%, 41%, and 39% respectively.

Economy

A 2017 study by Nobel Laureate in economics Edward Prescott, Lee Ohanian (senior fellow at the Hoover Institution), and Kyle Herkenhoff, estimates that if California were to roll back its land use regulations to where they stood in 1980, the state's GDP could permanently increase by almost $400 billion (a 14% increase).  "If every state rolled back land regulations to 1980 levels, [total US] GDP could rise by as much as $1.8 trillion [9%]."

A McKinsey Global Institute report estimates that the housing shortage is costing the California economy between 143 and 233 billion dollars per year, from lost construction activity (at least $85 billion annually), lower consumption of consumer goods because of high housing costs (at least $53 billion annually) and the costs of providing services to the increased number of homeless persons (at least $5 billion per year).

Quantifying the shortage

Estimated under-supply of housing units

The California Legislative Analyst's Office 2015 report "California's High Housing Costs - Causes and Consequences" estimates that for the state to have kept housing prices no more than 80% higher than the median for the U.S. as a whole (the price differential which existed in 1980, as opposed to the >150% differential which exists today), California would have needed to add approximately 210,000 new housing units each year over the past three decades (1980-2010), rather than the 120,000 / year which were built.  Their midpoint estimate of the underbuilding for the last three decades is 90,000 units per year, an estimated shortage of 2.7 million housing units (20%) by 2010.

Since 2010, the state's construction of new housing units has averaged well below 90,000 units per year.  It took a drop after the 2008 Great Recession, but has increased to about 90,000 / year in 2016.

In September 2017, a team of economists from UCLA Anderson Forecast, led by Jerry Nickelsburg, predicted that "it would take 20 percent more housing to achieve a 10 percent reduction in prices.  Such a reduction throughout California would bring costs down roughly to 2014 levels..."  In a 2018 UCLA Anderson Forecast report, economist Nickelsburg estimated the shortage at 3 million units.

In October 2017, lieutenant governor and gubernatorial candidate Gavin Newsom said that California should set a goal to produce 3.5 million new homes by 2025.  This would require a quadrupling of the current rate of building to almost 400,000 units per year, a rate the state has not experienced since 1954. 

In April 2018, state Senator Scott Wiener, author of several bills to reduce the housing shortage, estimated it at 4 million units.

In a 2019 paper, economists Enrico Moretti and Chang-Tai Hsieh analyzed the U.S. housing market and found that if Americans had consistently built housing commensurate with demand, the city of San Francisco would have two million housing units (rather than the 400,000 it has today) and a population of four million people (as opposed to its actual 2022 population of around 815,000), and the greater Bay Area would have five times the population it has today.

Increase in housing production needed
Experts say that California needs to double its current rate of housing production (85,000 units per year) just to keep up with expected population growth and prevent prices from further increasing, and needs to quadruple the current rate of housing production over the next 7 years in order to for prices and rents to decline.

Ratio of residents and jobs to housing units

In 2018, California ranked 49th among the United States in housing units per resident.

While some people claim that a "healthy" ratio of jobs to housing units is around two, many California metros are far from that, with San Diego at 3.9, Los Angeles at 4.7, and San Francisco at 6.8.

Responses

Federal
In a September 2016 report from the Executive Office of the President of the United States titled "Housing Development Toolkit",  the authors cited several of California state and localities' attempted legislative fixes for the housing shortage as models that it recommends other states and localities also follow to abate their housing shortages, including: 
 establish by-right development,
 tax vacant land or donate it to non-profit developers,
 streamline or shorten permitting processes and timelines,
 eliminate off-street parking requirements,
 allow accessory dwelling units,  and
 establish density bonuses.

The report also highlighted one of President Obama's remarks to the U.S. Conference of Mayors on January 21, 2016:

State

2016 Legislative session
In September 2016, Governor Jerry Brown signed AB 2406, AB 2299, and SB 1069, all of which reduce the cost and bureaucracy needed to construct an ADU (Accessory Dwelling Unit), also known as a "granny flat" or "in-law unit".  The Bay Area Council notes that if only 10 percent of the Bay Area's 1.5 million single family homeowners build ADU's, that would create 150,000 units of new housing.

This change resulted in dramatic increases in applications for ADU building permits; Los Angeles saw 25 times as many applications in the 2017 calendar year than it did in the previous two years combined.

2017 Legislative session
In the 2017 legislative session, a package of 15 housing bills was passed.  One bill legalizes microapartments as small as 150 sq. ft. and prohibits cities from limiting their numbers near universities or public transit; another (SB 2) adds a $75 real-estate document recording fee (for everything other than property sales), which is projected to generate $250 million per year for affordable housing construction. The total 2017 housing package is expected to have only a minimal impact on the shortage, because even the most optimistic predictions suggest that the measures will increase yearly housing production by about 14,000 units per year, still well short (14%) of the additional 100,000 new units needed yearly (in addition to the 80,000 being produced yearly) just to keep pace with population growth and prevent prices from rising.

Senate Bill 35

Another bill was Senate Bill 35 (SB 35), authored by state Senator Scott Wiener which shortens the approval process by eliminating environmental and planning reviews for new infill housing in cities which have failed to meet their state housing production goals.  The state sets goals for production of different types of housing: market-rate, low-income, etc., (to keep up with expected population growth) and this law applies only to development types for which the city is not meeting its production goal.  To make use of the streamlined approval process, the developer must pay prevailing wage and abide by union-standard hiring rules. Wiener said, "Local control is about how a community achieves its housing goals, not whether it achieves those goals.... SB 35 sets clear and reasonable standards to ensure that all communities are part of the solution by creating housing for our growing population." SB 35 has been used, for example, to redevelop the derelict Vallco Shopping Mall in Cupertino into a mixed-use development containing 2,402 apartments, half of them affordable, with no government subsidies, which will quintuple Cupertino's affordable housing stock.

2018 Legislative session

Senate Bills 827 and 50

In 2018, Senator Wiener introduced SB 827, which would have required localities to allow buildings of at least 4 or 8 stories within a half-mile of a high-frequency transit stop, or within a quarter-mile of a bus or transit corridor, as well as waiving minimum parking requirements in those areas. The bill was controversial, being opposed both by local governments concerned about the loss of local control of zoning, and by anti-gentrification activists concerned about displacement. The bill was supported by a group of scholars who stated that it would help reduce decades of racial and economic residential segregation, as well as pro-housing groups nationally, and by over 100 San Francisco Bay area technology industry executives who voiced their support of the bill in a joint letter.

Regarding the issue of local control, Wiener said: "In education and healthcare, the state sets basic standards, and local control exists within those standards. Only in housing has the state abdicated its role. But housing is a statewide issue, and the approach of pure local control has driven us into the ditch." Anti-displacement provisions were inserted in response to gentrification concerns. It was subsequently defeated in its first committee hearing.

In December 2018, Senator Wiener introduced a similar bill for the following legislative session, SB 50, which was defeated in a senate floor vote in 2020.

2021 Legislative session
In September 2021, Governor Gavin Newsom signed a package of 31 housing bills, including SB 9 and SB 10. SB 9 upzones most of California to allow building denser housing, up to a fourplex, on a lot. SB 10 streamlines the process for local governments to build dense housing around transit rich areas. Other bills aim to streamline the homebuilding process, reduce barriers to building affordable housing, and hold local governments responsible for building more housing.

Other bills that Governor Newsom signed include SB 290, AB 1584, SB 478, and AB 602. SB 290 expands California's density bonus law to include affordable housing for low income college students. Density bonuses allow developers to build denser housing, so long as a portion is set aside for affordable housing. AB 1584 makes void any housing covenants that would prohibit the construction of an ADU in certain circumstances.

SB 478 creates a minimum floor area ratio and a minimum lot size for multi-family housing that's between 3 and 10 units. SB 478 also prevents local governments from imposing a lot coverage requirement that would make it impossible for a housing project to achieve its minimum floor area ratio. AB 602 regulates impact fees that local governments can charge on housing. AB 602 makes impact fees more transparent, and requires local governments to make impact fees proportional to the square footage of the house.

2022 Legislative session 
In September 2022, Newsom signed a package of housing bills, including AB 2011, SB 6 and AB 2097. AB 2011 allows for affordable and mixed-income housing to be built on commercially-zoned property on a ministerial, by-right basis, as long as the projects fulfill affordability and environmental criteria, and pay prevailing wage. SB 6 allows for residential use on commercially zoned property without requiring a rezoning, as long as a percentage of construction workers hired are unionized. AB 2097 removes parking minimums for homes and commercial properties within one mile of public transit stations or in neighborhoods with low rates of car use.

Other efforts

Since 2014, several YIMBY (Yes In My Back Yard) groups have been created in the San Francisco Bay Area. These groups lobby both locally and in Sacramento for increased housing production at all price levels, as well as using California's Housing Accountability Act  ("the anti-NIMBY law")  to sue cities when they attempt to block or downsize housing development. One activist, in a comment to the San Francisco Planning Commission supporting the construction of a new 75-unit mostly market rate housing development stated that: "The 100 or so higher income people, who are not going to live in this project if it isn't built, are going to live somewhere...They will just displace someone somewhere else, because demand doesn't disappear."

As a way to rapidly create inexpensive housing, a Bay-Area startup company converts 8' x 20' shipping containers into homes for as little as $8,000, though due to expensive ($3,000 - $5,000 for a permit) and restrictive zoning in many cities, has found it hard to find locations that will allow the homes.

There are over 400,000 deed or use-restricted affordable housing units in California which were built with the provision that they remain affordable for the following decades (generally between 30 and 55 years) in exchange for subsidies. The state's Department of Housing and Community Development (HCD) estimates that there are more than 35,000 units whose affordability requirement will expire by 2021 and that many of these will likely be converted to market rent units. HCD has made the preservation of these units as affordable housing a priority.

Under the federal government's Section 8 voucher system, residents pay 30% of their salary and the Housing Authority pays the difference of the rental cost. As indicated by Metcalf (2018), "In 2015, 2.2 million households, comprising 5 million people, used rental vouchers to secure housing in the private market" though these figures are for the entire United States. Unlike other public assistance programs (such as SNAP or Medicaid) there are only a limited number of Section 8 vouchers, meaning that most people who apply and qualify for the program are not able to participate in the program, and instead are placed on a wait lists for years. The Housing Authority of the City of Los Angeles closed its Section 8 wait list for over a decade due to high demand, and only reopened in 2017.

See also
 California Environmental Quality Act
 San Francisco housing shortage
 Access to affordable housing in the Silicon Valley
 United States housing market correction
 California Senate Bill 35 (2017)
 California Senate Bill 50 (2019)
 Cost of rent by state and county in the United States

References

External links
 
 
 
California's High Housing Costs - Causes and Consequences

Housing in California
Welfare in California
Economy of California
Homelessness in the United States